Sabine Marcelis (born 1985) is a Dutch artist and designer. She is known for her work in furniture design and for working with brands such as Céline, IKEA, Isabel Marant and Stella McCartney. Her style typically includes pastel colours, minimalist shapes, and materials such as resin and glass, and her work focuses on themes of reflection and translucency.

Early life 
Marcelis was born in Alkmaar, Netherlands. She emigrated to Waihi, New Zealand, with her family at the age of 10. She briefly studied industrial design at Victoria University of Wellington before returning to Holland in her early twenties to study at the Design Academy Eindhoven. Before pursuing a career in design, Marcelis competed in semi-professional snowboarding.

Career 
After graduating from the Design Academy Eindhoven in 2011, Marcelis founded her eponymous studio in Rotterdam.

Installations 
Her contribution was a group of pieces titled "No Fear of Glass" (a play on Josep Quetglas Riusech's 2001 book about the building "Fear of Glass").

She produced a temporary installation titled "Swivel" in St Giles Square in London for the 2022 London Design Festival.

In 2022, the Vitra Design Museum staged "Colour Rush! An Installation by Sabine Marcelis" in which she reorganised the approximately 400 pieces held in the Schaudepot exhibition warehouse collection by colour.

Design 
She collaborated with IKEA on a collection of lamps and homewares which were commercialised in 2023. She has also designed furniture, lighting, and accessories for brands such as Natuzzi, Established & Sons, cc-tapis, Arco, Calico Wallpaper, and the Swedish furniture brand Hem.

Exhibitions and collections 
Her work is part of the permanent collection of museums such as the Vitra Design Museum in Germany, the Museum Boijmans Van Beuningen in the Netherlands, and the National Gallery of Victoria (NGV).

Her work has been exhibited at galleries such as Etage Projects in Copenhagen, Gallery Collectional in Dubai, Side Gallery in Barcelona, Carwan Galley in Greece, Gallery Sally Dan-Cuthbert in Australia, and Design Miami.

Teaching 
She is a mentor for the Women Bauhaus Collective and teaches at the École cantonale d'art de Lausanne.

Personal life 
She currently lives and works in Rotterdam. Her partner is the architect Paul Cournet.

Awards 

 2020 Wallpaper* "Designer of the Year"
 2019 Designboom Design Prize "Best Design Newcomer"
 2019 Elle Deco International Design Award "Young Designer of the Year"
 2019 GQ Men of the Year Awards "International Artist of the Year"

References

External links 

Living people
1985 births
People from Alkmaar
Design Academy Eindhoven alumni
Dutch furniture designers
Dutch industrial designers
Dutch expatriate sportspeople in New Zealand